Bondurant is an unincorporated community in western Fulton County, Kentucky, United States. It is named after an early settler, a descendant of a large party of French Huguenots who landed in Virginia in 1700 and settled above the falls of the James River.

References

Unincorporated communities in Fulton County, Kentucky
Unincorporated communities in Kentucky